Lee Jae-hun (born 28 November 1976) is a South Korean middle-distance runner. He competed in the men's 800 metres at the 2004 Summer Olympics.

References

1976 births
Living people
Athletes (track and field) at the 2004 Summer Olympics
South Korean male middle-distance runners
Olympic athletes of South Korea
Place of birth missing (living people)
Athletes (track and field) at the 2002 Asian Games
Athletes (track and field) at the 2006 Asian Games
Asian Games competitors for South Korea